Black Rock is an album by American guitarist James Blood Ulmer recorded in 1982 and released on the Columbia label. It was Ulmer's second of three albums recorded for a major label.

Reception
The Allmusic review by Thom Jurek awarded the album 4½ stars, and states, "Black Rock is among Blood's strongest records. As tough as Are You Glad to Be in America? and the Music Revelation Ensemble's No Wave, yet more accessible than either. This is a fitting introduction to Blood Ulmer's unique, knotty, and truly original guitar and composition style. Black Rock is all funk, rock, jazz, and punk, indivisible and under a one world groove".  

Trouser Press described both Black Rock and the previous Free Lancing as "technical masterpieces, making up in precision what they lack in emotion (as compared to Are You Glad to Be in America?). Working to expand his audience, Ulmer concentrates more on electric guitar flash, and actual melodies can be discerned from the improvised song structures (improvisation being one of the keys to harmolodics)."

Track listing
All compositions by James Blood Ulmer except as indicated
 "Open House" - 5:21
 "Black Rock" - 3:23
 "Moonbeam" - 5:11
 "Family Affair" (Ulmer, Irene Datcher) - 7:26
 "More Blood" - 4:43
 "Love Has Two Faces" - 5:29
 "Overnight" - 3:26
 "Fun House" (Ulmer, Grant Calvin Weston) - 4:53
 "We Bop" -2:58

Personnel
James Blood Ulmer - electric guitar; vocals (tracks 2, 4, 6)
Ronald Drayton - rhythm guitar (except 5, 8)
Amin Ali - electric bass, backing vocals (2), lead vocals (8)
Grant Calvin Weston - drums; backing vocals (2, 7)
Cornell Rochester - second drums (1, 3, 5 & 6)
Sam Sanders - tenor saxophone (3), alto saxophone (7)
Irene Datcher - vocals (4, 6)

References

Columbia Records albums
James Blood Ulmer albums
1982 albums